The 2017 Campeonato Brasileiro Série D, the fourth level of the Brazilian League, was contested by 68 clubs. The competition started on 21 May and ended on 10 September 2017.

Atlético Acreano, Globo, Juazeirense and Operário Ferroviário qualified for the semi-finals and were promoted to the 2018 Campeonato Brasileiro Série C.

Operário Ferroviário won the title after defeating Globo in the final.

Competition format
In the first stage, 68 teams were divided into seventeen groups of four, organized regionally. The teams played home and away against the other three teams in their group, a total of six games. The winner of each group plus the best 15 runners-up qualified for the second stage. From the second stage on the competition was played as a knock-out tournament with each round contested over two legs. The four semi-finalists qualified for the 2018 Campeonato Brasileiro Série C.

First stage

Group A1 (AC-AP-AM-RO)

Group A2 (AM-PA-RR-TO)

Group A3 (AC-PA-RO-RR)

Group A4 (AP-MA-PI-TO)

Group A5 (CE-MA-PI-RN)

Group A6 (CE-PE-PI-RN)

Group A7 (AL-BA-PB-PE)

Group A8 (BA-PB-PE-SE)

Group A9 (AL-BA-RN-SE)

Group A10 (DF-GO-MT-MS)

Group A11 (DF-GO-MT-MS)

Group A12 (GO-MG-RJ-SP)

Group A13 (ES-MG-RJ-SP)

Group A14 (ES-MG-RJ-SP)

Group A15 (PR-RS-SC-SP)

Group A16 (PR-RS-SC-SP)

Group A17 (PR-RS-SC-SP)

Second stage
The Second stage was a two-legged knockout tie, with the draw regionalised.

Qualification and draw
The 32 qualifiers (17 group winners and 15 best performing group runners-up) were divided into two pots. Pot 1 contained the 16 best performing group winners. Pot 2 contained the worst performing group winner and the 15 qualifying group runners-up. In pot 1 the teams were numbered 1 to 16 in numerical order of the group they qualified from. In pot 2 the teams were numbered 17 to 32 in numerical order of the group they qualified from. In the case that one of the qualifying runners-up was from the same group as the worst performing group winner, both teams would be in pot 2 and the group winner would be numbered lower in sequence than the group runner-up.

To keep the draw regionalised Team 1 played Team 18, Team 2 played Team 17 and this pattern was repeated throughout the draw. The higher numbered team played at home in the first leg.

Ranking of group winners
Ranking of group winners to determine the worst performing team to be placed into pot 2 is achieved by comparing 1) Points gained 2) Most victories 3) Best goal difference 4) Most goals scored 5) Sort.

Ranking of group runners-up
Ranking of group runners-up to determine the 15 best performing teams to be placed into pot 2 is achieved by comparing 1) Points gained 2) Most victories 3) Best goal difference 4) Most goals scored 5) Sort.

Qualification pots

Ties
The second stage matches were originally scheduled between 1 and 9 July, but they were rescheduled due to the investigation involving São Raimundo. The matches were postponed by the CBF for a week. Finally, the matches were played between 8 and 16 July. 

|}

Third stage
The third stage was also a two-legged knockout tie, with the draw regionalised. The ties were predetermined from the second stage, with the winner of second stage tie 1 playing the winner of second stage tie 2, etc. The matches were played between 22 and 30 July.

Ties

|}

Final stage
The final stage was a two leg knockout competition with quarter-finals, semi-finals and finals rounds. The draw for the quarter-finals was seeded based on the table of results of all matches in the competition for the qualifying teams. First played eighth, second played seventh, etc. The top four seeded teams played the second leg at home. The four quarter-final winners were promoted to Série C for 2018. 

The draw for the semi-finals was seeded based on the table of results of all matches in the competition for the qualifying teams. First played fourth, second played third. The top two seeded teams played the second leg at home.

In the finals, the team with the best record in the competition played the second leg at home.

Quarter-finals seedings

Quarter-finals ties
The matches were played between 5 and 14 August.

|}

Semi-finals seedings

Semi-finals ties
The matches were played between 19 and 28 August.

|}

Final
The matches were played on 3 and 10 September.

|}

References

Campeonato Brasileiro Série D seasons
2017 in Brazilian football leagues